Union Township is one of eight townships in Bollinger County, Missouri, USA. As of the 2000 U.S. Census, its population was 1,035. As of the 2010 U.S. Census, the population had increased to 1,058.

Union Township was established in 1848.

Demographics
As of the 2010 U.S. Census, there were 1,058 people living in the township. There were 497 housing units in the township. The racial makeup of the township was 96.03% White, 1.70% Black or African American, 0.57% Native American, 0.19% Asian, 0.19% from other races, and 1.32% from two or more races. Approximately 0.28% of the population were Hispanic or Latino of any race.

Geography

Incorporated Areas
The township contains no incorporated settlements.

Unincorporated Areas
The township contains the unincorporated areas and historical communities of Alliance, Hurricane, North Patton, Patton, and Patton Junction.

Cemeteries
The township contains two cemeteries: Johnson and Pleasant Hill.

Streams
The streams of Baltimore Creek, Blue Creek, Buck Creek, Cape Creek, Conrad Creek, Goose Creek, Grounds Creek, Little Whitewater Creek, and Stannett Creek flow through Union Township. Other bodies of water located in the township include the Whitewater River, Destitute Acres Lake, Fulton Lake, and Grindstaff Lake.

Landmarks
Amidon Memorial Conservation Area
Little Whitewater Conservation Area

Administrative Districts

School Districts
Meadow Heights R-II School District

Political Districts
Missouri's 8th Congressional District
State House District 145 
State Senate District 27

References

 USGS Geographic Names Information System (GNIS)

External links
 US-Counties.com
 City-Data.com

Townships in Bollinger County, Missouri
Cape Girardeau–Jackson metropolitan area
Townships in Missouri